Nogometni klub Zagreb (Zagreb Football Club), commonly known as NK Zagreb or simply Zagreb, is a Croatian amateur football club based in the Croatian capital city of Zagreb. It currently competes in the fifth tier league competition of Croatian football league system, Četvrta nogometna liga Središte Zagreb podskupina A in Croatian (Fourth football league Region Zagreb division A) since the 2021–22 season and the revision of league in preparation for structure reorganization in a men's league system of Croatian football league system starting from 2022–23 which also led to labeling changes for the league levels.

The club was founded in 1908 as HŠK Zagreb, meaning Hrvatski športski klub Zagreb (Croatian Athletic Club Zagreb). After World War II NK Zagreb had a considerable success in former Yugoslavia being enlisted as a notable club (at least 10 top-flight seasons or at least one title) in Yugoslav First League. Zagreb played a total of 18 seasons in the top flight before league got disintegrated in 1991 with only Croatian big teams Hajduk, Dinamo and Rijeka achieving more competitive seasons. The biggest achievement in that period happened in 1964–65 season when Zagreb finished 6th under the management of coach Gustav Lechner and contribution of an all-time club legend, prolific forward Zlatko Dračić, a league top goalscorer.

From 1992 to 2016 Zagreb played in top division of Croatian football then known as Prva hrvatska nogometna liga (Croatian First Football League), short Prva HNL or 1.HNL or simply HNL as a founding club member with the exception of 2013–14 season. The greatest accomplishment in Croatian football came in 2001–02 season. Under the guidance of manager Zlatko Kranjčar, against all odds, NK Zagreb surprisingly won the championship, with club's young striker Ivica Olić securing a title of league top goalscorer. It was the first time since its establishment in 1992 and, by some accounts, the first time in 57 years that the Croatian champion was not Dinamo Zagreb or Hajduk Split, an achievement that was repeated only once, 15 years later by HNK Rijeka. 

Another rarity that Zagreb achieved in the Croatian football happened in 2013–14 season when they promptly won Croatian Second Football League, thus becoming the only football club in Croatia to ever hold titles in both first and second division. Zagreb were also finalist of 1997 Croatian Football Cup and finalist of Croatian Football Super Cup in 2002.

In October 2018, after eviction from their historical home venue, Stadion u Kranjčevićevoj, NK Zagreb is using their training camp ZAGREBello with an approximate capacity of 1,000 as a home ground for its official fixtures, which is located in Veslačka street. The team's traditional home colours are white shirts, shorts and socks, which is the reason why they are referred to as Bijeli in Croatian, meaning "The Whites". Another popular nickname of the club is "The Poets", Pjesnici in Croatian, due to their former location of home ground at Kranjčevićeva street, which is named after Croatian poet Silvije Strahimir Kranjčević and became a well-known phrase "club from the street of poet", that was often used by the popular radio sports commentator Ivo Tomić for NK Zagreb when broadcasting football matches. The less known, outmoded nickname Pogorelci, roughly translated as "The Smolders" formed in late 1977 as a result of blazing fire which obliterated Zagreb's stadium, is being used once again to refer and describe the present-day state of affairs at the club.

Although NK Zagreb is currently competing in the fifth tier of Croatian Football League, it competed in the top-level as a founding member of First Croatian Football League for 24 seasons until 2016 (with an exception of 2013–14 season), when the club was relegated from first division for its second and the last time. From 2009–10 season due to non-existence of club board, lack of income and sponsorship, poor management skills and unprofessional behavior of its president, by the end of next decade club faced three relegation drops in four seasons, loss of professional status, loss of its traditional home ground and loss of its supporters. For long period of time, in particular from 1950s to 2010s, NK Zagreb was the second strongest and famous football club in city of Zagreb and by far the most famous football club in Trešnjevka neighbourhood. Also, NK Zagreb participated several times in the European competitions like UEFA Champions League (2), UEFA Cup Winners' Cup (4), UEFA Intertoto Cup (10) and Inter-Cities Fairs Cup (10).

History

Foundation thesis

PNIŠK misconception

The club was inaccurately considered to be founded in 1903 as PNIŠK (Prvi nogometni i športski klub, translated First Football and Athletic Club), being one of the first to be formed in Croatia. First secretary was Dragutin Baki, the president was Vilhelm Witte, and the captain of the team and instructor was Czech Jan Todl. Since there weren't any clubs to play with, the first official match was played between the club's players divided into two groups in 1904. Ticket income from the match was 3 krone and 3 filers.

The first international match was played in 1905 against Hungarian champions Ferencváros on Magyar Athletikai Club's pitch. The home team won with a high 11–1 score. The players who played for Zagreb were: Filipčić, Schwarz, Todl, Mutefelija, Slavnič, Ugrinić, Polivka, Uhrl, Višinger, Koruna, and Torbić.

According to sports historians, the history of the club can be linked only to beginnings in 1908 and 1910 with the founding of Hrvatski športski klub Zagreb (Croatian Athletic Club Zagreb) and Hrvatski tipografski športski klub Zagreb (Croatian Typographic Athletic Club Zagreb), while some see the roots of the club in the founding of Športski klub Zagreb, (Athletic Club Zagreb) in 1919.

Post-WWII restitution

After the Second World War, Fizkulturno društvo Zagreb (Zagreb Sports Society) or short FD Zagreb was established on 10 October 1946 by merging newly founded local clubs Sloboda and Tekstilac with re-established Amater and Grafičar. Among them, Grafičar was the club with the biggest reputation and results dating back to 1908 when it was founded under the name Hrvatski (tipografski) športski klub Zagreb (Croatian (Typographic) Athletic Club Zagreb).

In 1950, FD Zagreb changed its name to present-day Nogometni klub Zagreb. On 7 February 1952 decision was made for the First Division team Borac Zagreb (ex Milicioner Zagreb) to integrate with Nogometni klub Zagreb who was at the time a second tier club not able to secure a promotion in newly formed Yugoslav football league system. NK Zagreb continued to bear its name, acquiring so, a license for the upcoming first division season. 

On 9 August 1960 club was once again reunited with NK Grafičar (renovated in 1949) and accepted the adjective "Grafički" to its full name Grafički nogometni klub Zagreb. The adjective was soon dropped out of every day usage and was eventually abandoned. In 1980, NK Zagreb merged with local side NK Zagrebački plavi (which was previously called NK Jedinstvo) from west Trnje neighborhood, whose playground in Veslačka street eventually became Zagreb's training camp and later on, home venue named ZAGREBello.

Yugoslav football league system

During the Yugoslav era, NK Zagreb played a total of 18 seasons in the First Football League of Yugoslavia. The seasons were: 1952, 1952–53, 1954–55, 1955–56, 1956–57, 1957–58, 1964–65, 1965–66, 1966–67, 1967–68, 1968–69, 1969–70, 1973–74, 1976–77, 1977–78, 1978–79, 1980–81 and 1981–82. The greatest success in that period was in the 1964–65 season when NK Zagreb won 6th place under coach Gustav Lechner and with a prolific forward Zlatko Dračić who became top scorer with 23 goals in 26 league appearances.

One of the most notable matches Zagreb played know as "Great drama in Maksimir" was on 19 July 1973 when a qualifying match between NK Zagreb and NK Osijek took place on Maksimir stadium. It was a second leg of two qualifying matches for entering the First League. The first leg was played in city of Osijek and ended up in a drew, 0-0. Although Zagreb was the better opponent throughout the whole match, they failed to secure a goal in front of 25,000 spectators. The second leg was played in Maksimir because of great ticket demand – the attendance was 64,138 which broke the stadium record and stands to this day. The game saw dramatic comeback from NK Zagreb making it a 2-2 drew at the full time whistle. Zagreb achieved promotion after penalty shootout which ended with 4-3 score in favor of Zagreb. Zagreb's celebration started after crucial penalty kick was converted by late substitute, forward Hajrudin "Prika" Hušidić. Zagreb team lineup for this match was: 

Horvat, Gašparini, Tucak, Antolić, Ivanišević, Lipovac (Bakota), Čopor, Močibob (Hušidić), Rukljač, Markulin, Smolek.

Another notable match Zagreb played is also a qualification match held in June 1985. NK Zagreb, after being relegated from Yugoslav Second League West in 1983–84 season, promptly won their corresponding North division of Croatian Republic Football League in 1984–85 season. At Kranjčević Street venue in front of 15000 gathered supporters Zagreb team led by Kurbaša and Petravić generation achieved magnificent 4-1 win against West division winner NK Orijent in a semi-final match played for Second League West division promotion, but in the end failed to finish qualification campaign victorious by losing the finals to South division winner NK Zadar on penalties. For next two seasons Zagreb repeated the same success by winning their North division titles in 1985–86 and 1986–87, but in both occasions failed to secure a promotion to Second League in the last stage of finals against Mladost Petrinja and Šparta Beli Manastir.

Croatian football league system

NK Zagreb competed in the First Croatian Football League from the very beginning in 1992 as a league founder till the end of 2012–13 season when they got relegated to the Second Croatian Football League for the first time. After promptly winning the title in second division, Zagreb returned and managed to play two more (2014–15, 2015–16) seasons in top level of Croatian football before irretrievably plunging into overall deterioration which in the end led to up-to-date situation.

Zagreb is the first club to break the dominance of Dinamo and Hajduk in Croatian football. It happened in 2001–02 season and was the first Croatian club after 57 years to be a national champion without being Hajduk Split or Dinamo Zagreb. Credit for that success goes to team head coach Zlatko "Cico" Kranjčar and very much his standardized lineup for the season. Among Zagreb's more notable players that season was Ivica Olić, the club's best scorer of the season, who led the club to its first championship of the Prva HNL with 21 goals scored in 29 appearances. The main eleven line up for triumphal team who carried out the achievement was: 

Vasilj, Stavrevski, Pirić, Ješe, Bulat, Poldrugač, Duro, Hasančić, Franja, Lovrek, Olić.  

Also worth mentioning here is Joško Popović who played for NK Zagreb in the 1990s, 4th all-time top scorer ever in Prva HNL.

Zagreb's final honorable achievements in Prva HNL before the downfall were in the 2004–05 and 2006–07 season when they finished 3rd overall and in the 2007–08 season when they reached semi-finals of the Croatian Cup.

Downfall

In August 2015 Zagreb players declared strike and refused training practice in preparation for the 5th round and away game against RNK Split bringing in question the game itself and so on the regularity of Prva HNL which was already seriously shattered. The club was in debt, players not receiving wages for six months. Zagreb president Dražen Medić had several offers for players that would at least somewhat stabilized the situation in the first division club from Kranjčevićeva, but refused them all. Strike was ongoing for a week ahead of matchday with players demanding to be paid at least partially.

Relegation drops

The club were relegated to the third division in 2017 and finished in 9th place in their first season in the league.

2019 relegation

The club suffered a disastrous start to 2018–19 Third Croatian Football League West season with opening 5-0 away defeat at hands of NK Krk. In next round Zagreb faced "home" defeat 3-0 from Orijent 1919 which was played thankfully to NK HAŠK and their Stadion na Peščenici venue as club officials were unaware of pitch replacement process at Kranjčević Street home ground and failed to make all necessary preparations needed for licensing their training camp ZAGREBello venue for its home matches. General lineup for the team at season opening was:

Kurtović, Čilić, Vinski, Tarić, Zebić, Bektaši, Mihoković, Marinić, Jokić, Pavlic, Regović, Rajnović.

It was no surprise to anybody, but rather disbelief, as results achieved in 2018–19 season were outcome of clubs controversial president Dražen Medić decision to start the competition with the youth team members. Zagreb inexperienced young players suddenly found themselves playing main roles in their first senior football ever at first team, many of them directly skipping through youth teams such as above mentioned Karlo Mihoković who was age 16 at the time. Of course, decision backfired and Zagreb's reality soon became once again bleak and cataclysmic. Questionable attitude with no responsibility towards these young players, among whom were certainly talented ones like Kurtović, Tarić and Jokić resulted with incalculable consequences on their careers, collectively failing to display their talents in competitive manner through the trials of third-division football. Zagreb stringing noxious defeat after defeat was strip away from any relegation battle as only relegation candidate throughout entire season. 

Continuation of a defeat queue: NK Maksimir 3-1 (A), NK Vinogradar 9-1 (A), NK Vrbovec 3-1 (H).

They even managed to miss a game against NK Jadran Porec for not having a licensed doctor at the match.

Kranjčevićeva eviction

In 2018 after managing Stadion Kranjčevićeva as their home ground since 1946 for 72 years, NK Zagreb was denied of new managing contract by the city's officials which in the end led to eviction from the venue in October 2018. So, as of 2018–19 season NK Zagreb is using their training camp ZAGREBello venue with an approximate capacity of 1000 as a home ground for its official fixtures which is located in Veslačka street.

Name changes

Hrvatski športski klub Zagreb (1908 – June 1912)
Hrvatski tipografski športski klub Zagreb (June 1912 – July 1918)
Športski klub Plamen (July 1919 – 1920)
Športski klub Zagreb (1920 – June 1941)
Fiskulturno društvo Zagreb (10 October 1946 – 1950)
Nogometni klub Zagreb (1950–8 August 1960)
Grafički nogometni klub Zagreb (9 August 1960 – 1961)
Nogometni klub Zagreb (1961–present)

Stadium

Stadion u Kranjčevićevoj ulici, known as Stadion Concordije between 1921 and 1945, also known as Stadion NK Zagreba or Stadion Zagreba between 1946 and 2018 is a multi-purpose stadium located in the north-east part of Trešnjevka neighbourhood in city of Zagreb, Croatia. The stadium at what was then called Tratinska cesta (Tratinska road) began construction in 1911 and was soon halted due to outbreak of Great War in 1914. With the end of Great War in 1918 the construction resumed and was eventually completed in 1921. At the time of its completion it was the biggest stadium in Zagreb and was owned and operated by one of three Zagreb based sports powerhouses named HŠK Concordia. The peculiarity of this stadium is non-existence of the usual athletic track. Instead, a profiled circular cycling track was built, the so-called cyclodrome, unique in Croatia and is used for various cycle and track race formats.

In 1931 the first floodlit match ever held in Zagreb was played at Kranjčević Street Stadium. The team consisted of best eleven Zagreb based players named Zagreb XI hosted the team of Real Madrid and eventually won 2–1. With the Second World War end, partially being seen as a national (Croatian) representative by newly in-powered communist authorities and partially due to communist doctrine of Novi početak (The New beginning), HŠK Concordia was condemned as unfit. Concordia was immediately disbanded and all its property confiscated along with stadium which was soon afterwards set on fire. One year later, in 1946, now state owned stadium was finally handed over to newly formed Fiskulturno društvo Zagreb (Zagreb Sports Society), whose football section later evolved into today's Zagreb Football Club. NK Zagreb's third jersey was green in honour of Concordia whose stadium they were using.

In November 1977 a large blazing fire destroyed the west stand of stadium for the second time which led to NK Zagreb's earning the nickname Pogorelci, meaning The Smolders. In following years the stadium went through several reconstructions and modifications. The most significant one was an extensive overhaul and construction of adjoining facilities in preparation for the 1987 Summer Universiade. Later that year a lightning strike destroyed the floodlights during a match between NK Zagreb and NK Osijek leaving Kranjčević Street Stadium without any floodlight capabilities for more than 20 years, till 2008, when the new ones were re-installed by the City of Zagreb.

After 2006–07 season and prior to NK Zagreb first leg game against Vllaznia in the Intertoto Cup stadium's capacity was reduced due to UEFA standards from 12,000 to 8,850 people by placing numbered plastic chairs in the west stand and reducing the space for visiting supporters at the eastern stand. The stadium consists of two stands. The west stand is fully seated and can hold 3,850 spectators. It houses the press box and the VIP area. The east stand has 5,000 standing places and is mainly used for travelling fans. In June 2008 UEFA inspection had visited the Kranjčević Street Stadium and gave it a 3-star rating, but criticised the lack of floodlights (which have been installed two months later) and press box provisions. With the capacity of 8,850 people, Kranjčević Street Stadium is the second biggest stadium in Zagreb, behind Stadion Maksimir. Currently within the stadium, there are small number of offices and one restaurant. Today, the stadium is in use and open to public only on the official match days.

Supporters
The club ultras group are called "White Angels" (Bijeli Anđeli). The fans are strongly left-wing and are part of the anti-fascist movement.

Honours
Croatian First League
Winners (1): 2001–02
Runners up (2): 1992, 1993–94
Third place (3): 1992–93, 2004–05, 2006–07
Croatian Second League
Winners (1): 2013–14
Fourth Football League Center
Third place (1): 2020–21
Croatian Cup
Runners up (1): 1996–97
Croatian Super Cup
Runners up (1): 2002
Yugoslav Second League
Winners (6): 1953–54, 1963–64, 1972–73, 1975–76, 1979–80, 1990–91
Runners up (1): 1974–75
Third place (2): 1970–71, 1971–72
Yugoslav Third League
Winners (1): 1989–90
Third place (1): 1988–89

Results by season

Key

Top scorer shown in bold when he was also top scorer for the division.

P = Played
W = Games won
D = Games drawn
L = Games lost
F = Goals for
A = Goals against
Pts = Points
Pos = Final position

1. HNL = Prva HNL
2. HNL = Druga HNL
3. HNL = Treća HNL
4. NL = Četvrta NL Centar

GS = Group stage
PR = Preliminary round
R1 = Round 1
R2 = Round 2
QF = Quarter-finals
SF = Semi-finals
RU = Runners-up
W  = Winners

European record

Summary

Source: uefa.com, Last updated on 9 January 2010Pld = Matches played; W = Matches won; D = Matches drawn; L = Matches lost; GF = Goals for; GA = Goals against. Defunct competitions indicated in italics.Note: This summary includes matches played in the Inter-Cities Fairs Cup, which was not endorsed by UEFA and is not counted in UEFA's official European statistics.

Record by season

Record by country of opposition

Correct as of 14 June 2011

Pld – Matches played; W – Matches won; D – Matches drawn; L – Matches lost; GF – Goals for; GA – Goals against

Player records

Most appearances in UEFA club competitions: 8 appearances
Jasenko Sabitović
Željko Sopić
Top scorers in UEFA club competitions: 3 goals
Nino Bule
Krunoslav Lovrek

Historical list of managers

Club management

Administration
 President: Tomislav Čilić
 Vice President: 
 General Director: 
 Sports Director:
 Technical Director: Igor Šestić
 Head of Accounting and Finance: Anđelka Matić
 Secretary: Tino Madunović
 Spokesman: Zlatko Abramović

Source: nkzagreb.hr, Last updated unknown

Coaching staff
 Coach: Dražen Madunović
 Asst. Coach: Zlatko Bašic
 Fitness coach: Vedran Naglić
 Goalkeeping Coach: Željko Nježić
 Youth Team Coach: Drago Rukljač, Ivan Jurilj

Source: SportNews.hr, Updated  9 January 2019

References

External links

 

NK Zagreb at UEFA.com
White Angels supporters' club 

 
Association football clubs established in 1908
Football clubs in Croatia
Football clubs in Zagreb
Zagreb
1908 establishments in Croatia